Toms Creek Falls is a waterfall in the Pisgah National Forest in McDowell County, North Carolina, near the town of Marion.

Geology
The 60-foot falls are located on Toms Creek.  The creek flows over several cascading upper sections of bedrock into a near-vertical lower cascade, ending in a small scoop in the rocks.  A wide, flat pool area is at the base, located in a gully that has large amounts of mica embedded in the rock.

Visiting the Falls

From the junction of US 221 and US 70 in Marion, go north on US 221 for 5.6 miles.  Turn left on Huskins Branch Rd. and go 1.2 miles to a small parking area located before the bridge that crosses Toms Creek.  From the Parking lot, follow the moderate-difficulty 0.4 mile trail to a short, moderately steep climb and scramble down to the base of the falls.  A small creek crossing used to be required, but a bridge has been built over the creek.  An old mine is located just downstream of the plunge pool.

Nearby Falls
Catawba Falls
Linville Falls
 Crabtree Falls (North Carolina)

References

External links
 Video Overview of Toms Creek Falls

Protected areas of McDowell County, North Carolina
Waterfalls of North Carolina
Pisgah National Forest
Landforms of McDowell County, North Carolina